James William Chappell (born in Michigan in 1955), professionally known as Jim Chappell, is an American New Age and jazz pianist.  During the late 1980s and early 1990s, Chappell placed five albums in the Top Twenty of Billboard's Top New Age Albums chart, and placed another album in the Top Twenty of their Top Contemporary Jazz Albums chart.

Recording history
Chappell's first album, Tender Ritual, was a collection of piano solos released in 1985 on his own Unspeakable Freedom label. In 1986, Chappell was signed with the newly formed Music West Records. That same year, Chappell released Dusk, another collection of piano solos.  It would be the first of Chappell's albums to appear on a Billboard chart, peaking at No. 19 on its Top New Age Albums chart.

With his third album, Chappell's records started to include small-ensemble accompaniment and (on 1990s Saturday's Rhapsody) full orchestration.  His three albums in this style—1989's Living in the Northern Summer, Saturday's Rhapsody, and 1991's Nightsongs and Lullabies—all appeared on the Billboard Top New Age Albums chart.

In 1992, Chappell switched to the Real Music label, where his music became more jazz-oriented.  There were four such albums—In Search of the Magic (1992), Over the Top (1993), Manila Nights (1994) and The Earthsea Series, Volume 1 (1994).  On the latter three, Chappell was backed by HearSay, a jazz quartet.  The first of them, 1993's Over the Top, appeared on Billboard'''s Top Contemporary Jazz Albums chart. This album was also successful in the Philippines, enough such that Chappell booked a three-date concert hall tour of the islands in the summer of 1993 and sold out all of the shows.

Chappell's final album with Real Music was 1994's Laughter at Dawn.  It saw Chappell returning to his original style of solo piano and was the last of his albums to appear on a Billboard chart.

Chappell moved to Gallery Records in 1996 and recorded one album there.  He released nothing further until 2002, when he began releasing albums on his own Unspeakable Freedom label.  None of them  have appeared on any Billboard charts.

Critical reception

In his review of Chappell's Nightsongs and Lullabies, Jim Aikin noted that "Chappell's pastel piano meditations ... are the musical equivalent of airbrushed greeting-card watercolors of cute bunny rabbits and fawns." However, he went on to say that Chappell is "a consummate craftsman—a sensitive pianist and gifted melodist who knows some genuinely interesting chords."

In a review of one of Chappell's contemporary jazz albums, Jonathan Widran of AllMusic praised Over the Top for its "energetic live interaction" with fellow performers.

Personal life
Chappell has a brother named Gary Chappell. Gary Chappell worked as a manufacturer for Music West Records.

Discography

When originally released on the Unspeakable Freedom label, Tender Ritual'' had catalog number RB-101.

Real Music re-released all five of the Music West albums.  These re-releases have catalog numbers RM-0131 through RM-0135.

Notes

Further reading
  A discussion (in Italian) of Chappell's work through 1996.

External links
 Official Web Site
 Chappell's artist page at Real Music

American jazz pianists
American male pianists
Jazz musicians from Michigan
New-age musicians
Smooth jazz pianists
Living people
1955 births
21st-century American pianists
21st-century American male musicians
American male jazz musicians